The Lord Lieutenant of Nairn, is the British monarch's personal representative in an area which has been defined since 1975 as consisting of the local government district of Nairn, in Scotland, and this definition was renewed by the Lord-Lieutenants (Scotland) Order 1996. Previously, the area of the lieutenancy was the county of Nairn, which was abolished as a local government area by the Local Government (Scotland) Act 1973. The district was created, under the 1973 act, with the boundaries of the county, as a district of the two-tier Highland region and abolished as a local government area under the Local Government (Scotland) Act 1994, which turned the Highland region into a unitary council area.

List of Lord Lieutenants of Nairn 

Hugh Rose, 15th of Kilravock, 1729– 23 January 1732
James Brodie, 21st of Brodie 17 March 1794 – 17 January 1824
William Brodie, 22nd of Brodie 9 February 1824 – 6 June 1873
James Campbell John Brodie, 12th of Lethen 25 June 1873 – 25 February 1880
Hugh Fife Ashley Brodie, 23rd of Brodie 25 March 1880 – 20 September 1889
James Rose, 23rd of Kilravock 22 November 1889 – 16 November 1903
Ian Ashley Morton Brodie, 24th of Brodie 6 November 1903 – 1935
Archibald Leslie-Melville, 13th Earl of Leven 8 July 1935 – 15 January 1947
John Grahame Buchanan Allardyce 16 April 1947 – 21 September 1949
Hon. Ian Malcolm Campbell 5 December 1949 – 1958
James Erskine Stirling 4 December 1958 – 20 December 1968
Alexander Leslie-Melville, 14th Earl of Leven 22 July 1969 – 1999
Ewen John Brodie, 16th of Lethen 9 November 1999 – 16 December 2017
George Russell Asher 19 January 2018 – present

References

County of Nairn
Nairn